Leo Anthony Giacometto (May 14, 1962August 8, 2022) was an American US Army officer, politician, and lobbyist.

Personal life
Leo Anthony Giacometto was born on May 14, 1962 in Belle Fourche, South Dakota to Sondra Floyd and Leo Eugene Giacometto.  He grew up in Alzada, Montana on a sheep ranch.

Giacometto met his first wife, Mildred Echeverria, in Panama.  He had two children: Tasha Giacometto and Leo Cassidy Giacometto (born in ).

In 2019, Giacometto was engaged to Aurelia Skipwith, an attorney, biologist, and former lobbyist for Monsanto who was President Donald Trump's nominee for director of the United States Fish and Wildlife Service. During her confirmation process in the United States Senate, Skipwith's relationship with Giacometto was scrutinized after it was revealed that she did not disclose her ties with Giacometto, a registered lobbyist on behalf of agricultural businesses, to whom she was engaged. The two married in New Orleans on September 25, 2021.

Giacometto died on August 8, 2022, in Bahrain, and was buried on the family ranch in Alzada.

Career

Military
A graduate of the Montana Military Academy and United States Army Military Police Academy, Giacometto served in the United States Army and Army Reserve from 1980 through 2003 before retiring as a lieutenant colonel.

Politics
In 1987, Giacometto was elected to the Montana House of Representatives, where he served until 1990.

On February 28, 1990, President George H. W. Bush nominated Giacometto as US marshal for Montana.  On April 5, the United States Senate unanimously confirmed him, making Giacometto the then-youngest US marshal in history.  He left the Marshals in 1993, before his four-year term was complete.  Giacometto was also a magistrate judge.

Giacometto was the Montana Department of Agriculture director from 1993 through 1995 under Governor Marc Racicot. 

In 1995, Giacometto became the chief of staff for US Senator Conrad Burns, working out of the Dirksen Senate Office Building.  After a national magazine identified Giacometto as the single congressional staffer "who took the most junkets at the expense of industry and other private interests", he left Burns' employ in 1999 to become a lobbyist for Morrison–Knudsen.

Upon the election of Governor Judy Martz, she appointed Giacometto to one Montana's two seats on the Northwest Power and Conservation Council (NPCC), where he annually earned .  In 2001, Giacometto submitted a falsified travel invoice in connection with his appointed duties, for which he was being prosecuted in 2002 by the Lewis and Clark county attorney; he was acquitted of the misdemeanor in January 2001 by a six-member jury.  That August, Giacometto was the first person at the scene of the drunk-driving accident that killed Montana Representative Paul Sliter, and was seen "trying to hide beer cans and bottles that had spilled from [Shane] Hedges' wrecked pickup, in which Sliter had been riding."  Giacometto was also the subject of investigation by Lewis and Clark County law enforcement officers for allegedly threatening Missoulian columnist Mary Jo Fox (through state senator John Harp) for an article critical of the governor.  Giacometto left the NPCC seat in March 2002.

Civilian
In 1999, Giacometto became the vice president of government affairs for both Washington Group International (until 2001) and Morrison–Knudsen.  In 2005, he was a lobbyist for the Vector Group.

References

1962 births
2022 deaths
American lobbyists
businesspeople from Montana
members of the Montana House of Representatives
military personnel from Montana
military personnel from South Dakota
military police of the United States Army
Montana state court judges
people from Belle Fourche, South Dakota
people from Carter County, Montana
ranchers from Montana
United States Army officers
United States Army reservists
United States congressional aides
United States Marshals